The cue sports competition at the World Games 2017, including three-cushion billiards, nine-ball (a pool discipline) and snooker, took place from 26 to 30 July at the Wroclaw Congress Center in Wrocław, Poland.

Participating nations

Medalists

Medal table

References

External links
 Results book

 
2017 World Games
2017
World Games
World Games